The 2022 Copa América Femenina Final was a football match on 30 July 2022 that took place at Estadio Alfonso López in Bucaramanga, Colombia, to determine the winners of 2022 Copa América Femenina. The match took place between hosts Colombia and Brazil.

Brazil defeated 1–0 Colombia to win their 8th title. As winners, they will compete in the inaugural 2023 Women's Finalissima against England, winners of UEFA Women's Euro 2022.

Venue
The final match of the tournament was held in Estadio Alfonso López at the city of Bucaramanga. With the capacity of only 28,000, the stadium had never hosted any major football tournament, except being the home of Atlético Bucaramanga, a top division club of Colombia's Categoría Primera A. Despite its lack of importance and small size, the stadium was selected to host the final match of the competition. The choice stirred much controversies due to its inferior standard for the final of a continental tournament.

Route to the final

Colombia
As the host of the tournament, Colombia was effectively drawn into the Group A, sharing with Ecuador, Chile, Paraguay and Bolivia. The Colombians made their group stage (played in Estadio Olímpico Pascual Guerrero, Cali) route smoothly at the beginning by beating Paraguay 4–2, before easily surpassed a weaker Bolivian side 3–0. The Colombians then faced a sterner Ecuadorian side, and only managed to snatch the win thanked to Linda Caicedo, all came at the first half as it finished 2–1. Colombia finally demolished Chile 4–0, guaranteeing the first place of the group and kicking Chile out of the knockout stage. In the semi-finals, Colombia had a hard time against Argentina, only snatching a 1–0 win thanks to Linda Caicedo again to book a place in the final and qualified for the 2023 FIFA Women's World Cup, as Colombia aimed to win its first ever trophy after finishing second twice.

Brazil
The most decorated team in the tournament, having won it seven times, including the recent 2018 edition, Brazil was drawn in Group B with the other South American champions Argentina, as well as Peru, Uruguay and Venezuela, Brazil proved too powerful for the group stage; the Brazilians easily dispatched Argentina 4–0 in the first match, before settled another easy 3–0 win over Uruguay. With Brazil not playing in Matchday 3, the team returned to action in Matchday 4 against Venezuela, as the Brazilians again proved its domination with a 4–0 win. With the top of the table assured, Brazil obliterated a weak Peru side 6–0 to conquer the group undefeated and conceding no goal. In the semi-finals, Brazil had a more difficult game against a stern Paraguay, but managed to win 2–0 nonetheless, to match to the final with a perfect winning record and conceding none, as well as qualified for the 2023 FIFA Women's World Cup.

Match
Carolina Arias (Colombia) was suspended by CONMEBOL due to violation of health protocols and was excluded from the final.

Details

Notes

References

External links
Official website

Final
Brazil women's national football team matches
July 2022 sports events in Colombia